John Pyel (born c. 1310 – 1382) was a London merchant who was elected Mayor of London in 1372.

Biography

He was born circa 1310 in Irthlingborough, Northamptonshire and inherited land there from his father, which he added to during his lifetime.  In 1353 he purchased the manor of Irthlingborough from Sir Simon de Drayton. His brother Henry became Archdeacon of Northampton.

He became a merchant in London, served from 1369 as an Alderman of Castle Baynard ward, was Sheriff of London in 1369 and elected Mayor of London in 1372. He was elected Member of Parliament for the City of London in 1361 and 1376 as one of the two aldermanic representatives of the city.

In 1375 he obtained a royal licence to found the college of St. Peter, Irthlingborough, a college for six secular canons — one of whom should be dean — and four clerks, but died before his intention was actually carried out. The design, involving the development of the local parish church into a chantry college, was eventually accomplished with the help of the Archdeacon of London by his widow, Joan, in 1388.

In 1349, a person of this name was serving as a royal official, in Chesterton, Cambridgeshire.

Death
He died in 1382. He had married Joan and had two sons. A memorial to him can be found in the John Pyel Chapel of St. Peters Church, Irthlingborough on the south side of the main altar.

See also
 List of Sheriffs of the City of London
 List of Lord Mayors of London 
 City of London (elections to the Parliament of England)

References

1310 births
1382 deaths
Year of birth uncertain
14th-century lord mayors of London
Sheriffs of the City of London
English MPs 1361
Members of the Parliament of England for the City of London
People from Irthlingborough
English MPs 1376